Phillipus Jacobus Snyman 'JP' du Plessis (born 29 April 1991) is a South African professional rugby union player who plays centre position for the New Orleans Gold of Major League Rugby (MLR) in the U.S.

Du Plessis previously played for the San Diego Legion in the MLR.

Early years

Du Plessis grew up playing rugby union in South Africa starting his career as school pupil at Reitz High School in Reitz and later moving to Paul Roos Gymnasium in Stellenbosch. He was selected to represent  at the Under-16 Grant Khomo Week tournament in 2007 and represented them at the premier high school rugby union competition in South Africa, the Under-18 Craven Week, in 2009. After that event, he was also named in the 2009 South African Schools squad. He played off the bench in their 86–3 against Italy and scored South Africa's only try in their 13–45 defeat by England three days later.

Rugby league

Du Plessis was then one of two South African youngsters that moved to Australia to join rugby league side the Sydney Roosters, the other being Brian Skosana. He never played for the first team, but did represent their Under-20 side in the 2010 Toyota Cup.

Rugby union

Melbourne Rebels

In 2010, Du Plessis reverted to rugby union, signing with the  Super Rugby side for their inaugural season in Super Rugby in 2011.

Western Province / Stormers

Du Plessis returned to South Africa in 2011 to sign for the Cape Town-based . He made seven appearances for the  side during the 2011 Under-21 Provincial Championship, scoring five tries which included four in their 38–42 loss to the s in Johannesburg.

Du Plessis was included in the ' 2012 Super Rugby squad.

He was then called up to their Currie Cup side and made nine appearances for them during the 2012 Currie Cup Premier Division.

Montpellier

He didn't feature for the Stormers in the 2013 Super Rugby season and opted to move to France to join Top 14 side  prior to the 2013–14 Top 14 season.

Free State Cheetahs

He returned from France after just one season to join the  prior to the 2014 Currie Cup Premier Division.

He wasn't named in the  Super Rugby squad for the 2015 Super Rugby season, instead playing in four matches for the  side that played in the 2015 Vodacom Cup competition.

Eastern Province Kings

Du Plessis was named in the  squad for the 2015 Currie Cup qualification tournament, but didn't feature for them at all, instead joining Port Elizabeth-based side  prior to the 2015 Currie Cup Premier Division season.

References

1991 births
Living people
Afrikaner people
Eastern Province Elephants players
Expatriate rugby league players in Australia
Expatriate rugby union players in Australia
Expatriate rugby union players in France
Expatriate rugby union players in the United States
Free State Cheetahs players
Melbourne Rebels players
Montpellier Hérault Rugby players
People from Kroonstad
Rugby union centres
Rugby league centres
San Diego Legion players
South African expatriate rugby league players
South African expatriate rugby union players
South African expatriate sportspeople in Australia
South African expatriate sportspeople in France
South African expatriate sportspeople in the United States
Southern Kings players
Stormers players
Western Province (rugby union) players
New Orleans Gold players